Focus con Proby is the seventh studio album by the Dutch rock band Focus, released in 1977 on EMI Records. It features five tracks with vocals from American singer P. J. Proby. The record also features guitarists Eef Albers and Philip Catherine, drummer Steve Smith (then with Jean Luc Ponty and later to become part of Journey), as well as the two Focus members from previous albums. Smith and Albers would later go on to collaborate on the first two albums of Smith's band Vital Information.

Reception
In a mixed review in the Richmond Review, reviewer Bob Beech preferred the instrumental tracks over the songs with vocals. He deemed Proby's voice more mellow than his previous records which he preferred, but felt it was out of place on a Focus album. Brian Brennan wrote in Calgary Herald that while Albers is "an accomplished musician" he does not live up to the standard of past Focus guitarist Jan Akkerman. He thought the album consisted of "fussy instrumental work, aimless, hollow and rather uninviting".

Track listing

Personnel
Musicians
 Thijs van Leer – Hammond organ, piano, electric piano, Mellotron, synthesiser, flute
 Bert Ruiter – bass guitar
 Steve Smith – drums
 Philip Catherine – acoustic guitar, rhythm guitar, lead guitar on "Sneezing Bull", "Maximum" and "How Long"
 Eef Albers – rhythm guitar, lead guitar (except above)
 P. J. Proby – vocals on "Wingless", "Eddy", "Brother", "Tokyo Rose" and "How Long"

Production
 Yde de Jong – production
 Jan van Vrijaldenhoven – engineer
 Mike Stavrou – engineer
 Jacques Heere – cover design

Charts

References

1978 albums
Focus (band) albums
EMI Records albums
P. J. Proby albums